Petro Petrovych Slobodyan (2 July 1953 in the village of Sheparivtsi, Stanislav Oblast – 15 December 2020) was a Soviet football player and a Ukrainian coach.

Honours
 Soviet Top League winner: 1975, 1977.
 European Under-23 Championship winner: 1976.

International career
Slobodyan made his debut for USSR on 28 November 1976 in a friendly against Argentina.

External links
  Profile

1953 births
2020 deaths
Soviet footballers
Soviet Union international footballers
Soviet Top League players
FC Avanhard Ternopil players
FC Dnipro players
FC Dynamo Kyiv players
FC Lokomotiv Moscow players
Ukrainian footballers
Ukrainian football managers
FC Obolon Kyiv managers
Association football forwards
Sportspeople from Ivano-Frankivsk Oblast